Edward C. Horton (born December 17, 1967) is a retired American professional basketball player who was selected by the Washington Bullets in the second round (39th pick overall) of the 1989 NBA draft. He was a 6'8", 230 lb. forward.

Horton played one full season in the NBA, appearing in 45 games and averaging 4.5 ppg for the Bullets during the 1989–90 season.

Horton was part of George Raveling's recruiting class at the University of Iowa in 1985 which included B. J. Armstrong, Roy Marble, Les Jepsen and Kevin Gamble. All five recruits went on to play in the National Basketball Association. Horton and Gamble played together at Lanphier High School in Springfield, Illinois. Horton was First Team All-Big Ten in 1988–89.

External links
Career stats at basketball-reference.com

1967 births
Living people
African-American basketball players
American expatriate basketball people in Argentina
American expatriate basketball people in Israel
American men's basketball players
Basketball players from Illinois
Columbus Horizon players
Fargo-Moorhead Fever players
Iowa Hawkeyes men's basketball players
Maccabi Tel Aviv B.C. players
McDonald's High School All-Americans
Parade High School All-Americans (boys' basketball)
Power forwards (basketball)
Rapid City Thrillers players
Rockford Lightning players
Small forwards
Sportspeople from Springfield, Illinois
Tulsa Zone players
Washington Bullets draft picks
Washington Bullets players
Yakima Sun Kings players
21st-century African-American people
20th-century African-American sportspeople
Titanes de Morovis players
Polluelos de Aibonito players